Qoaling Highlanders is a Lesotho football club based in Maseru. It is based in the city of Maseru in the Maseru District.

The team currently plays in Lesotho Premier League.

Stadium
Currently the team plays at the 1,000 capacity Qoaling Ground.

References

External links
Soccerway

Football clubs in Lesotho